Niklasons is a Swedish TV series in 10 28-minute episodes from 1965. The script for the series was written by Lars Björkman and Ove Magnusson. The series was directed by Hasse Ekman. Several popular Swedish actors and comedians make guest appearances on the show, among others: Kar de Mumma, Rolf Bengtsson, Lena Söderblom, Gösta Bernhard, Gunnel Broström, Sten Ardenstam, Inga Gill, Gösta Ekman, Siv Ericks, Olof Thunberg, Christina Schollin, Sven Lindberg as well as Hasse Ekman himself.

Cast
Bengt Niklason - Karl-Arne Holmsten
Elisabeth Niklason - Sickan Carlsson   
Monica Niklason - Ulla Neumann
Lasse Niklason - Christian Peters
Harry Njutgärde - Fredrik Ohlsson
Maj Njutgärde - Lissi Alandh
Tommy Njutgärde - Peter Thelin

External links

1965 Swedish television series debuts
1965 Swedish television series endings
Swedish television sitcoms
1960s Swedish television series